The Pentagon Papers is a 2003 American historical drama television film about Daniel Ellsberg and the events leading up to the publication of the Pentagon Papers in 1971. The film documents Ellsberg's life starting with his work for RAND Corporation and ending with the day on which the judge declared a mistrial in Ellsberg's espionage case. The film was directed by Rod Holcomb, written by Jason Horwitch, and stars James Spader as Ellsberg. The cast also includes Claire Forlani, Alan Arkin, and Paul Giamatti. The film aired on FX on March 9, 2003.

Cast

 James Spader as Daniel Ellsberg
 Claire Forlani as Patricia Marx
 Paul Giamatti as Anthony Russo
 Alan Arkin as Harry Rowen
 Kenneth Welsh as John McNaughton
 Maria del Mar as Carol Ellsberg
 Sean McCann as John Mitchell
 Jim Downing as H.R. Haldeman
 Richard Fitzpatrick as John Ehrlichman
 Jonas Chernick as Neil Sheehan
 Amy Price-Francis as Jan Butler
 Aaron Ashmore as Randy Kehler
 Damir Andrei as Leonard Boodin
 Carl Marotte as Charles Nesson
 David Fox as Rechter W. Matthew Bryne
 Martin Roach as Sgt. Watson
 Sharon McFarlane as Charlotte
 Owen Rilan as Cororra
 George R. Robertson as Senator Fulbright
 Robert Seeliger as FBI Agent
 Roland Rothchild as FBI Agent
 Neville Edwards as Bailif
 Matt Cooke as Rand Employee
 Jonathan Higgins as Army Officer at Rand
 Daneen Boone as Blonde at Russo's
 Judah Katz as District Attorney
 Bruce Gooch as Supreme Court Marshal
 Mark Benesh as Leonard Compson III
 Troy Blendell as Marine Radio Man
 Amy Troung as Vietnamese Woman
 Kris Saric as Marine Captain in Bar
 Derek Murchie as Air Force Officer in Bar

Production
The film was shot in Toronto. Filming locations included Old City Hall, Osgoode Hall, the Distillery District, the Mowat Block, and University College.

See also
 The Most Dangerous Man in America: Daniel Ellsberg and the Pentagon Papers (2009 Oscar-nominated feature documentary)
 The Post (2017 film)

References

External links
 
 
 

2003 television films
2003 films
2003 drama films
2000s English-language films
2000s historical drama films
2000s legal drama films
American films based on actual events
American historical drama films
American legal drama films
American political drama films
Cold War films
Drama films based on actual events
American drama television films
Films about freedom of expression
Films about whistleblowing
Films directed by Rod Holcomb
Films scored by Normand Corbeil
Films set in 1970
Films set in 1971
Films set in Boston
Films shot in Toronto
FX Networks original films
Historical television films
Paramount Pictures films
Pentagon Papers
Political films based on actual events
Television films based on actual events
Vietnam War films
2000s American films